Jérémy Manière (born 26 July 1991) is a retired Swiss footballer.

Career

Stade Lausanne Ouchy
On 29 June 2019 it was confirmed, that Maniére had joined FC Stade Lausanne Ouchy. On 1 March 2020 28-year old Maniére announced, that he had decided to retire due to his knee, as he was afraid that his knee would be too broken for him to have a life after football.

References

External links

Swiss men's footballers
FC Thun players
Yverdon-Sport FC players
FC Biel-Bienne players
FC Lausanne-Sport players
Swiss Challenge League players
Swiss Super League players
1991 births
Living people
Association football defenders